Kittu is a 2006 traditionally animated Indian feature film.  It is the first animated film to be made in the Telugu language. It won the National Film Award and is also credited with AP state award (Nandi Award) as second best children's film 2006.

Production 

It was produced by Bhargava Kodavanti, of Bhargava Pictures and directed by B. Sathya and released on 21 July 2006.  The film is approximately 125 minutes long.

Awards

See also 

 Cinema of Andhra Pradesh
 List of Indian animated feature films

References

External links 

 Kittu at India Glitz
 Post on a blog about Telugu language 

2006 animated films
2006 films
Animated feature films
Indian animated films
2000s Telugu-language films
Best Animated Feature Film National Film Award winners
Animated films about apes